Cheles is a municipality located in the province of Badajoz, Extremadura, Spain. According to the 2005 census (INE), the municipality has a population of 1296 inhabitants.

References

Twin towns
 Tuxtla Gutiérrez, Chiapas, México

Municipalities in the Province of Badajoz